Najran University is a state-funded public research university located in Najran, Saudi Arabia. It was established in 2006 by a royal decree from King Abdullah bin Abdulaziz Al Saud.

The university offers undergraduate and graduate programs in various disciplines such as engineering, medicine, business, education, social sciences, and humanities.

History

Beginning 
Najran University began as a community college of King Khalid University. On 11 November 2006, King Abdullah Bin Abdulaziz issued the royal directive to convert the community college in Najran into an independent self-sustaining university.

Academics

Colleges
The university currently  includes fourteen colleges as follows:

 College of Applied Medical Sciences.
 College of Health Sciences.
 College of Pharmacy.
 College of Dentistry.
 College of Medicine.
 College of Computer Science & Information Systems.
 College of Education.
 College of Engineering.
 College of Administrative Sciences.
 College of Languages.
 College of Science and Arts.
 College of Sharia.
 College of Science and Arts of Sharoura.
 Community College.
 College of Pharmacy

External links

Najran University Official Website
Saudi Arabia University List

References

2006 establishments in Saudi Arabia
Najran
Universities and colleges in Saudi Arabia
Educational institutions established in 2006